Jordan Aleksander Majchrzak (born 8 October 2004) is a Polish professional footballer who plays as a forward for Roma, on loan from Legia Warsaw II.

Career
Majchrzak is a youth product of Warta Zawiercie, AF Silent Dąbrowa Górnicza, Rozwój Katowice and Legia Warsaw. On 23 September 2022, he joined the Serie A club Roma on loan for the 2022–23 season with an option to buy. Originally assigned to their reserves, he made his professional debut with Roma as a late substitute in a 4–3 Serie A away loss to Sassuolo on 12 March 2023.

International career
Majchrzak was called up to a training camp for the Poland U19s in February 2023.

Personal life
Majchrzak's father Robert Majchrzak is a football coach who managed his first youth club Warta Zawiercie.

Playing style
Majchrzak is a headstrong forward who does not show signs of stress or nervousness, but hates losing. Tall and strong, he is good at holding up play with his back towards goal and plays aggressively. He is an energetic presser, known as a workhorse for his team.

References

External links
 
 

2004 births
Living people
People from Zawiercie
Polish footballers
Association football forwards
Legia Warsaw II players
Legia Warsaw players
A.S. Roma players
III liga players
Serie A players
Polish expatriate footballers
Polish expatriate sportspeople in Italy
Expatriate footballers in Italy